Lt Col Mimy Matimbe is an officer in the South African Army and was appointed as the first female Commanding Officer in the South African Army Artillery Formation when she took over command of 4 Artillery Regiment on 7 April 2017.

Early life

Mimy Matimbe was born at Mamelodi, north east of Pretoria in 1977 and matriculated from Thabo Tsako High School in 1995. She obtained a Bachelor's degree in Commerce from Vista University, Mamelodi Campus in 1999.

Military career 

She completed Basic Military Training under the Voluntary Military System (VMS) at 3 SAI Bn at Kimberley, Northern Cape, in 2002 and was appointed as a Gunnery Instructor at Gunnery Wing, School of Artillery  in Potchefstroom from 2005-2007. Observation Post Officer in 2008-2010 at 43 Battery, 4 Artillery Regiment. She was appointed as Battery Commander of the Target Acquisition (45) Battery two years later.

In 2014, the then Maj Matimbe served as 2IC Artillery Mobilization Regiment until 31 March 2017. She was promoted to lieutenant colonel in April 2017 and was appointed as the Officer Commanding, 4 Artillery Regiment on 7 April 2017. She is the first woman ever to command an artillery regular force unit in South African Military History. She was awarded the crossed-barrels by the South African Artillery Corps Council on 8 November 2019 by Brig Gen Khaya Makina during end of the year investiture celebrated at the 'Dan Tloome Banquet Hall', Potchefstroom. She handed over command of her regiment in late 2020 and has since completed the SANDF Joint Senior Command and Staff Programme during 2021 and served briefly as staff officer at Headquarters of Artillery and presently at the Joint Operational Headquarters.

Honours and awards

Medals

References 

South African military officers
Living people
1977 births
People from Pretoria